Temple B'nai Abraham is a synagogue in Livingston, New Jersey. It was established in Newark in 1853.

In 1973, the congregation moved to Livingston and sold the building to the Deliverance Evangelistic Center, a Pentecostal Church. It was added to the National Register of Historic Places in 2007.

Dr. Joachim Prinz, the rabbi from 1939 to 1976, modernized the ritual and introduced his own prayer book. Dr. Prinz, who had escaped Nazi Germany in 1937, became a vocal civil rights leader in the United States, known globally for his moving rhetoric. His successor, Rabbi Barry Friedman introduced further innovations in the services and wrote and edited the prayer book Siddur Or Chadash. In 1999, Rabbi Clifford Kulwin became the synagogue's fourth religious leader in 98 years. Rabbi David Z. Vaisberg became the next senior rabbi in 2019. For much of the 20th Century, Temple B'nai Abraham identified itself as a traditional progressive congregation, independent of the organized synagogue movements.

See also 
 National Register of Historic Places listings in Essex County, New Jersey

References 

Evangelical churches in New Jersey
Jews and Judaism in Newark, New Jersey
Synagogues in New Jersey
Synagogues on the National Register of Historic Places in New Jersey
Neoclassical architecture in New Jersey
Synagogues completed in 1924
Religious buildings and structures in Essex County, New Jersey
Buildings and structures in Newark, New Jersey
National Register of Historic Places in Newark, New Jersey
New Jersey Register of Historic Places
Culture of Newark, New Jersey